Alois Beranek (15 January 1900 – 22 May 1983) was an Austrian football player, manager and referee, born in Vienna. Beranek was a referee in the 1934 and 1938 FIFA World Cup tournaments and a linesman at the 1950 FIFA World Cup.

Playing career
He played for Wacker and ASV Hertha Wien.

Coaching career
Beranek managed Rapid Vienna to an Austrian league championship in 1956.

Refereeing career
Beranek refereed from the 1930s to the mid-1950s. He refereed matches at the 1934 and 1938 FIFA World Cup finals tournaments.

References

External links 
 
 
 

Austrian football managers
Austrian footballers
Austrian football referees
SK Rapid Wien managers
1900 births
1983 deaths
Footballers from Vienna
FC Admira Wacker Mödling players
1934 FIFA World Cup referees
1938 FIFA World Cup referees
FIFA World Cup referees
Association footballers not categorized by position
Austrian people of Czech descent